The Main Library is the primary library of the San Francisco Public Library, located in San Francisco's Civic Center.

History
In 1986, a task force was set up to complete the design of the Civic Center, including the use of Marshall Square, next to the main library at the time, for a new main library. Construction on the current Main Library began on March 15, 1993, financed by a  bond measure. The building was completed in 1995 and opened a year later on April 18, 1996. The old main library, which was damaged in the 1989 Loma Prieta earthquake, was rebuilt as the new Asian Art Museum.

The new library includes over 300 computer terminals, room for 1100 laptops, and a new wing for children. The city spent $104.5 million on the new library. Library visits doubled in its first year open, from 1.1 million to 2.1 million, and the number of library card holders nearly tripled.

In October 1996 author Nicholson Baker wrote a critical article in The New Yorker about the weeding of books from the library as it moved to the new building. He was also critical about the elimination of the card catalog when the computerized catalog was introduced. Due to this negative publicity, the library released an official response to Nicholson's New Yorker article, criticizing his claims.  There has also been criticism in the local press that the atrium significantly and deliberately reduced the amount of floor space available for shelving the library's collection which resulted in the destruction of over 200,000 books which were then buried in a landfill, gutting the research collections of one of the most important research facilities on the West Coast, all of which occurred away from public sight or review. Later, under intense pressure that included then Mayor Willie Brown, City Librarian Ken Dowlin whose policy it was to weed and subsequently destroy the books, was forced to resign in January 1997.

The library was prominently used in the 1998 film City of Angels.

References

External links
 
 

Beaux-Arts architecture in California
Civic Center, San Francisco
Libraries in San Francisco
Library buildings completed in 1995